Chuankou is a township of Lingbao, in western Henan province, China, located  east of downtown Lingbao and served by China National Highway 209. As of 2011, it has 24 villages under its administration.

References

Township-level divisions of Henan